McFarlan was a luxury American automobile manufactured in Connersville, Indiana, from 1909 to 1928, by the McFarlan Carriage Company and the McFarlan Motor Car Company.

History
McFarlan Carriage Company was founded in 1856 by English-born John B. McFarlan (1822-1909). J. B. McFarlan's grandson, Alfred Harry McFarlan (1881-1937) conceived the idea for the McFarlan motor car and ran the McFarlan Motor Car Company throughout its nineteen years. 

John B. McFarlan is credited with creating one of the earliest planned industrial parks in the United States. During 1887 he formed the Connersville Industrial Park.to bring manufacturers together from within the industry to have a purpose-build industrial site.  This transformed into an automobile manufacturing center which supported more than seven automobile marques.

Carriages to Motor Cars 
Harry McFarlan felt it was important to diversify the McFarlan carriage business. From introduction, the McFarlan motor car was a large, mid-to-high price automobile that was produced in small numbers (about 200 units annually) and always with an engine of six-cylinders. The McFarlan was introduced late in 1909. The first cars were road tested on a track that became the Indianapolis Motor Speedway.

In 1913 the McFarlan Motor Car Company superseded the McFarlan Carriage Company. Carriage production ended soon after.

A variety of proprietary engines (Wisconsin, Buda, Brownell, Continental) were used in the early McFarlans, with a Teetor-Hartley being settled on in 1916. The models were the Big Six and the Little Six offering two different price points to buyers. 

In 1917 the McFarlan became more-upscale on a 136-inch wheelbase with the 48-hp Teetor-Hartley engine. Having begun as a $2,000 car in 1909, the McFarlan rose in price, until by 1920 some models reached $6,200, .

Racing and Celebrity 
In the first model year of 1910, two of the company's cars were entered in the Indianapolis Labor Day races at the Indianapolis Motor Speedway where both McFarlans finished in the top five.  McFarlans driven by Mel Marquette were also entered in the first two Indianapolis 500 races (1911 and 1912) in which they finished 25th and 19th, respectively. 

Aiming for the top of the luxury market, one McFarlan Town Car displayed at the 1923 Chicago Auto Show, had the nickel-plating replaced with 24 carat gold, including a gold-plated interior. It reportedly was sold for $25,000, . McFarlans were known as "the most expensive car made in the US" and "the American Rolls-Royce" during the 1920s, a tribute shared by the Cunningham, a similar-appearing luxury car built in Rochester, New York, whose history mirrors that of the McFarlan.  

The McFarlan was a luxury automobile owned by celebrities of the day such as Wallace Reid, William Desmond Taylor, Fatty Arbuckle, Paul Whiteman, Jack Dempsey and Virginia governor E. Lee Trinkle.  Al Capone bought a McFarlan for his wife, Mae, in 1924 and bought a second one in 1926.

The Classic Era 
In 1921, McFarlan introduced an engine of its own design, the Twin-Valve Six (TV Six). The six-cylinder unit was actually an improved Teetor-Hartley engine with four-valves per cylinder, 18 spark plugs, pressure lubrication, triple ignition, displacing 573 cubic-inches and produced 120 horsepower. The TV Six  had a 140-inch wheelbase chassis with McFarlan coachwork that would offer up to a total of 10 different models.

In an attempt to lower prices and increase sales, McFarlan introduced a mid-priced Single-Valve Six model powered by a Wisconsin six-cylinder engine. The Single-Valve Six Model occupied a very competitive segment of the industry, and the McFarlan did not fair well, prompting the company to discontinue the model during 1926.

By 1925 the McFarlan Motor Car Company offered 2 distinct lines with a total of 26 different models ranging in price from $2,000 to $10,000. On a limited basis, McFarlan built commercial cars; ambulances, hearse, funeral cars and firetrucks usually powered with a Continental engine.

McFarlan coachwork for other manufacturers were an important part of the McFarlan Motor Company's business. The custom boat-tail speedster design by McFarlan was adopted for Duesenbergs and Auburns. McFarlan and its neighbor, the Central Manufacturing Company supplied the speedster bodies that appeared on the 1928 Auburn.

McFarlan attempted again to capture a share of the growing mid-market with the 1926 introduction of a straight-eight. The Line-8 was on a shorter 131-inch wheelbase and came equipped with a 79 horsepower Lycoming engine. It sold better than the Single-Valve model.

The 1927 McFarlan lineup included the Line-8 and the Twin-Valve Six offered in a variety of body styles. The Line-8 prices ranged from $2,650 to $4,600, . The Twin-Valve Six prices were among the most expensive on the market, ranging from $5,400 to $9,000, .

Fate 
The 1920's witnessed the failing health of Harry McFarlan, the post-World War I recession, and new products being introduced by other manufacturers. Harry McFarlan's long time associate Burton Barrows took over company operations, and introduced the Line-8 and new styling for Twin-Valve Six, but his health also failed and he passed away in 1928.  McFarlan's efforts to move into new market segments had thinned its resources, and when the company did introduce new styling in 1928 (the first since 1921), it was too late.  1928 became the final model year and on August 8, 1928 bankruptcy was declared. One year later on August 1, 1929, the factory was sold to the Auburn Automobile Company.  The Auburn Company used the factory for storage space for its unfinished automobiles, and it would later serve as a body shop for the Auburn. 

In 1967 a book, What Was the McFarlan? was privately published by authors Keith Marvin and Al Arnheim. It is considered the definitive history of the McFarlan Motor Car Company. The authors were McFarlan enthusiasts and avid automobile historians, and the book identified nineteen extant McFarlans. 

McFarlans are owned in private collections and automobile museums, including the Indianapolis Motor Speedway Hall of Fame Museum, the Petersen Automotive Museum in Los Angeles, the National Automobile Museum in Reno, Nevada, Historic Connersville in Connersville, Indiana and the Nethercutt Collection in California.

Gallery

See also
1911 Indianapolis 500 race results
1912 Indianapolis 500 race results
McFarlan automobiles at ConceptCarz
McFarlan at Coachbuilt.com
1921 McFarlan Catalog
1926 McFarlan photos

Defunct motor vehicle manufacturers of the United States
Motor vehicle manufacturers based in Indiana
Defunct companies based in Indiana
Fayette County, Indiana
Indianapolis 500
Luxury motor vehicle manufacturers
American companies established in 1909
Vehicle manufacturing companies established in 1909
Vehicle manufacturing companies disestablished in 1928
1909 establishments in Indiana
1928 disestablishments in Indiana
Historic American Engineering Record in Indiana
Luxury vehicles
Brass Era vehicles
Vintage vehicles
1910s cars
1920s cars

References 

Coachbuilders of the United States
Cars introduced in 1910